Nicolas Boukhrief (born 4 June 1963) is a French screenwriter, film director and actor.

Boukhrief started his career as a journalist. In 1990 he created the Newspaper of the cinema on Canal+, and was the writer in chief until 1993, when he became the adviser on programming cinema. Since January 1997, he has been a programmer and presenter of My film club on Canal+. Along with Richard Grandpierre he was co-person in charge for Canal Plus Ecriture, and since 1997, of the department of Eskwad production within that chain. He was Andrzej Żuławski's assistant from 1985 to 1987. Thereafter he was a co-scenario writer of Jean-Jacques Zilbermann's film Not Everybody's Lucky Enough to Have Communist Parents, and of Assassin(s), directed by Mathieu Kassovitz.

Filmography

References

External links
 

1963 births
Living people
French male screenwriters
French screenwriters
French male film actors
French film directors